Ayni Opera and Ballet Theatre (formerly known as the Tajik Musical Theatre, is a historic building and musical theatre in Dushanbe, Tajikistan. The building was named after Tajik poet Sadriddin Ayni.

References

External links
 (in Russian)
Aini Opera and Ballet Theatre tourism page on the Tajik Ministry of Internal Affairs Website

Buildings and structures in Dushanbe
Music organizations based in Tajikistan
Dance in Tajikistan
Opera houses